Diny Nurpeisovoy (Dina Nūrpeiısova) is a settlement serving a passing loop in Kurmangazy District, Atyrau Region of western Kazakhstan. It is named after Dina Nurpeisova, a Kazakh composer and dombura player. Population:  In 1999, the settlement did not have steady population.

The settlement serves a passing loop on the railway connecting Astrakhan and Atyrau. It is located in the extreme western part of the Region, close to the border with Russia.

References

Populated places in Atyrau Region